Juho Mynttinen (9 October 1859, Iitti – 29 May 1916) was a Finnish farmer and politician. He was a Member of the Diet of Finland from 1904 to 1906 and a Member of the Parliament of Finland from 1909 to 1910 and again from 1911 to 1913, representing the Finnish Party.

References

1859 births
1916 deaths
People from Iitti
People from Uusimaa Province (Grand Duchy of Finland)
Finnish Lutherans
Finnish Party politicians
Members of the Diet of Finland
Members of the Parliament of Finland (1909–10)
Members of the Parliament of Finland (1911–13)
19th-century Lutherans